The Infrastructure Protection and Disaster Management Division (IDD) is a division of the Science and Technology Directorate of the United States Department of Homeland Security. Within the Homeland Security Advanced Research Projects Agency, IDD develops technologies to improve and increase the United States' strategic preparedness response to natural and man-made threats through situational awareness, emergency response capabilities, and critical infrastructure protection.

Overview
The 2007 High Priority Technical Needs Brochure published by Homeland Security defines critical focus areas for Infrastructure and Geophysical research, falling primarily under the categories of "incident management":

 Integrated Modeling, Mapping and Simulation
 Personnel Monitoring (Emergency Responder Locator System)
 Personnel Monitoring (Physiological Monitoring of Firefighters)
 Incident Management Enterprise System
 Logistics Management
 Analytical tools to quantify interdependencies and cascading consequences as disruptions occur across critical infrastructure sectors
 Effective and affordable blast analysis and protection for critical infrastructure; improved understanding of blast failure mechanisms and protection measures for the most vital critical infrastructure

Notes

External links
DHS Infrastructure Protection and Disaster Management Division official website

Infrastructure Protection and Disaster Management Division